Ma Hogan's New Boarder was a 1915 film directed by Raymond Longford starring Charlie Chaplin impersonator Charles Evans. In the movie the lead "displays his antics and mannerisms."

It was one of Longford's few films not to feature Lottie Lyell and is considered a lost film.

Cast
C. Evans
B Gilbert
Q Cross
E. Vockler

Reception
Theatre managers offered to "supply cotton and buttons free to all patrons who damage them" during screenings of the film."

The Motion Picture News said that Charles Evans "gave a really clever impersonation of Charles Chaplin" but that "the production was too long to be anything more than ordinary."

References

External links

1915 films
Australian silent short films
Lost Australian films
Films directed by Raymond Longford
Australian black-and-white films